Vampire Savior, also known as Darkstalkers 3, is a fighting game developed and published by Capcom for arcades in 1997. It is the third game in the Darkstalkers series. The story centers around a demonic nobleman from Makai named Jedah Dohma, who creates a pocket dimension named Majigen where he tries to bring in souls to help nourish his new world. It was critically and commercially well-received.

Updated arcade versions with modified character rosters were released the same year in Japan, titled Vampire Hunter 2 and Vampire Savior 2. Home console ports, also with unique character rosters, were released for the Sega Saturn in Japan and the PlayStation worldwide in 1998.

Gameplay
The game retains the character roster of Darkstalkers: The Night Warriors, omitting Donovan, Huitzil and Pyron from the lineup. Taking their place are four new characters: Jedah, Lilith, Q-Bee and B. B. Hood. It also features a secret character/mode, Shadow, where the player assumes the identity of the defeated character for the next fight (e.g. if Morrigan is defeated, in the next fight the player will play as Morrigan).

Vampire Savior eschews the traditional round-based system in favor of what is dubbed the "Damage Gauge System": battles take place during a single round, with each fighter having two life bars and corresponding life markers similar to those in Rare's Killer Instinct. When one fighter loses a life marker after the life bar is emptied, the fighters reset their positions as if starting a new round, but the victorious fighter retains their remaining life bar. When the player is attacked, some of the health lost is displayed in white, which can be recovered if the player doesn't take any more damage. The game also introduces the "Dark Force System" which uses a bar or super meter to allow players to perform special abilities unique to each character for a limited period. The PlayStation version separates Dark Force into 2 modes from which the player chooses before each match: "Dark Force Change" is the same as the traditional Dark Force mode, whereas "Dark Force Power" is an enhanced mode that takes 2 bars of the super meter and the player can inflict damage that is not recoverable (but will also take non-recoverable damage). In Dark Force Power, the player can still activate their special enhancement, but they have to press a unique button combination rather than it being tied to whether or not the player is in Dark Force mode.

Plot
Jedah Dohma, one of the high nobles of Makai, is resurrected after a premature death long ago. Seeing the current chaotic state of the demon world, he decides that the only way to save Makai is to recreate it. To this end, he conjures a pocket dimension known as Majigen, to which he summons worthy souls to help feed his new world. As luck would have it, those souls belong to the returning Darkstalkers from the first two games, in addition to three newcomers.

Release
Vampire Savior was first released in Japanese arcades in 1997 as Vampire Savior: The Lord of Vampire. The game was originally planned to be released as Darkstalkers: Jedah's Damnation outside of Japan, but this title was never used; the Japanese arcade title was instead changed to Vampire Savior: World of Darkness in the U.S.

Updates 

Along with minor tweaks and changes to the characters' move lists, and the combo system (removal of air chains) the main difference between the two upgrades and the original Vampire Savior are in its character roster. Vampire Hunter 2 features the same character roster and soundtrack as Night Warriors (which was known as Vampire Hunter in Japan), omitting the characters introduced in Vampire Savior, while Vampire Savior 2 features the Vampire Savior cast along with Donovan, Huitzil and Pyron, omitting Jon Talbain (as well as Dark Talbain), Rikuo and Sasquatch. Both versions feature Oboro Bishamon and Shadow as secret characters, as well as Marionette, with which the fights consist of "mirror matches" (e.g. Morrigan vs Morrigan, Demitri vs Demitri). Vampire Hunter 2 also retains the music from the original Vampire Hunter, while Vampire Savior 2 uses the music from the original Vampire Savior.

Home versions
A Sega Saturn version was released in Japan only in 1998, which required Capcom's 4MB RAM cartridge. Capcom initially announced that the home version would be exclusive to the Saturn. This version contains all 15 characters from the original Vampire Savior as well as the three Night Warriors characters (Donovan, Huitzil, and Pyron) who were left out of the original arcade release and brought back in Vampire Savior 2/Vampire Hunter 2. Thanks to the 4MB RAM cartridge, this version more faithfully reproduces the 2D-animation fluidity of the arcade than either of the earlier console releases in the series. However, while Shadow is available in the Saturn version, Marionette is not.

Also in 1998, an update of the game was ported for the PlayStation as Vampire Savior: EX Edition in Japan and Darkstalkers 3 in North America and Europe. Although it is an EX version of the third canon game in the series, it is actually a compilation of Vampire Savior and its two Japan-only arcade updates. This version allows players to use all 18 Night Warriors and the two "hidden characters" (Shadow and Marionette) in all three games. It also features Oboro Bishamon and Dark Talbain as playable characters.

The game was included in Vampire: Darkstalkers Collection, a compilation of all five Darkstalkers arcade games that were released in Japan only for the PlayStation 2 in 2005. The collection also features unlockable secret versions of Vampire Savior, Vampire Hunter 2 and Vampire Savior 2 where all 18 Night Warriors are playable similar to the Playstation's EX Edition.

In 2012, the ESRB administered a Teen rating for Darkstalkers 3 as a PSone Classic for the PlayStation 3 and PlayStation Vita. The game was released through PlayStation Network on April 24, 2012.

It was also included in a remastered form as part of the HD remix game Darkstalkers Resurrection for the PlayStation Network and Xbox Live Arcade. Unlike the previous release for this game on the PSN, which used the PS1 version, the remastered edition is based on the original arcade release with added features like online multiplayer. In 2022, the Capcom Fighting Collection will include Vampire Savior, Vampire Hunter 2 and Vampire Savior 2 for the first time internationally as separate entries when the game releases on PlayStation 4, Xbox One, Nintendo Switch, and PC on June 24, 2022, with the same HD features and Online Play features as Darkstalkers Resurrection. Also Fighting Collection censors a secret ending.

Media
Several licensed tie-ins were released for the game in Japan:

Books
Vampire Savior Graphical Manual Kiso Chishiki Hen (Vol. 77) and Vampire Savior Technical Manual Jissen Katsuyō Hen (Vol. 89), two Gamest Mook ("magazine book") guide/art books published by Shinseisha.
All About Vampire Savior, a guide/art book published by Dempa Shimbunsha.
Vampire Savior Kōshiki Guide Book, a guide book written by Famitsu staff and published by ASCII.
Vampire Savior Perfect Guide, a Sega Saturn Magazine guide book published by SoftBank.
Vampire Savior Fan Book, the Gamest Mook Vol. 88 that is part of the "World Series" (Vol. 5) that deals more with games' settings, aesthetics, and behind-the-scenes info than the gameplay.
Vampire: Night Warrior Taizen, a book that covers every game in the 1990s series (including Vampire Hunter 2 and Vampire Savior 2).
Comic books
The Dark Lord and Where Souls Return To, a two-part novel written by Akihiko Ureshino and published by Gamest.
Vampire Savior: Child of the Lost Soul, a five-volume manga series authored by Mayumi Azuma and published by Gangan Comics. It stars Lilith and an original character, John Stately.
Vampire Savior Comic Anthology and Vampire Savior Comic Anthology Vol.2, two manga strip compilations by various artists, published by Shinseisha in the Gamest Comics series.
Vampire Savior, a manga anthology in the Shounen Oh Comics series by Hinotama Game Comics.
Vampire Savior, a manga anthology published by Enix as part of their Hyper G Comic Anthology series.
Vampire Savior, a manga anthology published by Movic.
Vampire Savior 4-Koma Ketteiban, a two-volume Gamest yonkoma manga compilation by various artists, published by Shinseisha.
Vampire Savior, a yonkoma manga published by Hinotama Game Comics as part of their 4-Koma Gag Battle series.
Vampire Savior 4Coma Comic, a yonkoma manga published by Movic in their G Collection series.
Vampire Savior, a yonkoma manga published by Enix in their 4-Koma Manga Theater series.
Other
Vampire Savior: The Lord of Vampire Capcom Game Soundtrack (VICL-60098~9), a 2-CD soundtrack released by Victor Entertainment.
Vampire Another Selection ~The Unreleased Takes~ (CFCL-0001), a soundtrack CD released by Suleputer.

In the United States, an English-language strategy guide was published by GameFan Books, with the guide using the unused Darkstalkers: Jedah's Damnation title.

Reception

Vampire Savior was positively received. In Japan, Game Machine listed Vampire Savior on their June 15, 1997 issue as being the second most-successful arcade game of the month. Game Machine also listed Vampire Savior II on their November 15, 1997 issue as being the tenth most-successful arcade game of the month. Next Generation reviewed the arcade version of the game, stating that "the game has its moments, but this series has so far reached its zenith in NightStalkers. DS3 is more of the same - it's fun, but nothing special." GamePro echoed these two conclusions, but in reverse priority: "... Vampire Savior is more of the same 2D fighting-game formula Capcom's been churning out for years. Despite this fact, however, the latest Darkstalkers entry holds up beautifully." They gave it a 4.5 out of 5 for fun factor and control, and a perfect 5.0 for sound and graphics. Both Next Generation and GamePro praised the game's smooth animation and striking special moves.

GameSpots Jeff Gerstmann hailed it as "easily the best fighter Capcom has put out in years" and noted it is "very well animated," even on the PlayStation, and "has an excellent soundtrack, and the character voices are all terrific." IGNs Randy Nelson described the "surprisingly fluid and animated" as well as "fast, fun, and surprisingly balanced" Darkstalkers 3 as "an exceptional effort from Capcom on a gameplay and technical front" and one of the best 2D fighting games on the PlayStation.

Retrospectively, GamesRadars Lucas Sullivan included Darkstalkers 3 among other lesser-known fighting game classics deserving HD remakes in 2012, stating that "the game’s crisp spritework is a marvel to behold – especially in the backgrounds, which convey the kind of creepy atmosphere that complements the supernatural fighters perfectly." Matt Edwards of Eurogamer opined that "playing it today [in 2013] is akin to playing Third Strike - not because these games are mechanically similar, but because Capcom tends to go the full distance with the second sequel."

Notes

References

External links
 Darkstalkers 3 at MobyGames
 Darkstalkers 3 at GameFAQs

1997 video games
Arcade video games
Cancelled Nintendo 64 games
CP System II games
Darkstalkers video games
Fighting games
2D fighting games
PlayStation (console) games
PlayStation Network games
Sega Saturn games
NESiCAxLive games
Video game sequels
Video games developed in Japan
Video games adapted into comics
Video games scored by Masato Kouda
Video games scored by Tetsuya Shibata
Video games with AI-versus-AI modes
Virgin Interactive games
Multiplayer and single-player video games